Sung-jae, also spelled Seong-jae, is a Korean masculine given name. Its meaning differs based on the hanja used to write each syllable of the name. There are 27 hanja with the reading "sung" and 20 hanja with the reading "jae" on the South Korean government's official list of hanja which may be used in given names.
 
People with this name include:
Lee Sung-jae (born 1970), South Korean actor 
Kim Sung-jae (1972–1995), South Korean hip-hop artist
Lee Sung-jae (footballer born 1976), South Korean football player
Kim Seong-jae (born 1976), South Korean retired football player 
Bae Sung-jae (born 1978), South Korean sports commentator
Lee Sung-jae (footballer born 1987), South Korean football player
Yook Sungjae (born 1995), South Korean idol singer, member of BtoB

See also
List of Korean given names

References

External links
Page for the name "성재" on erumy.com

Korean masculine given names